Annesley is a civil parish in the Ashfield District of Nottinghamshire, England.  The parish contains seven listed buildings that are recorded in the National Heritage List for England.  Of these, one is listed at Grade I, the highest of the three grades, one is at Grade II*, the middle grade, and the others are at Grade II, the lowest grade.  The parish contains the village of Annesley and the surrounding area.  All the listed buildings are outside the village itself, and most are centred round the Ruins of Annesley Old Church and the ruined Annesley Hall, which are both listed together with associated structures.  The active All Saints' Church, to the north of this area, is also listed.


Key

Buildings

References

Citations

Sources

 

Lists of listed buildings in Nottinghamshire